The 2016 Optimist U18 International Curling Championships were held from March 31 to April 3 at the Saville Sports Centre and Jasper Place Curling Club in Edmonton, Alberta.

Men

Round-robin standings
Final round-robin standings

Playoffs

Semifinal

Bronze medal game

Final

Women

Round-robin standings
Final round-robin standings

Playoffs

Semifinal

Bronze medal game

Final

References

External links

U18 Championships
U18 International Curling Championships, 2016
Sport in Edmonton
2016 in Alberta
April 2016 sports events in Canada